Milman Islet is a small island north of Shelburne Bay in far north Queensland, Australia about 140 km North of Cape Grenville, Cape York Peninsula in the Great Barrier Reef Marine Park Queensland, Australia. It is a hawksbill turtle nesting site.

See also

 List of islands of Australia

References

Islands on the Great Barrier Reef
Uninhabited islands of Australia
Islands of Far North Queensland
Great Barrier Reef Marine Park